The International Symposium on Experimental Algorithms (SEA), previously known as Workshop on Experimental Algorithms (WEA), is a computer science conference in the area of algorithm engineering.

Notes 

Computer science conferences